The Linux Desktop Testing Project (LDTP) is an open-source testing tool that uses computer assistive technology to automate GUIs. The GUI functionality of an application can be tested in Windows, Mac, Linux, Solaris, FreeBSD and embedded environments. The Mac OS X version is called PyATOM, and the Windows version is Cobra.

LDTP can test any accessibility-enabled GNOME application, Mozilla, OpenOffice.org, any Swing-based Java, Qt 4-based and KDE 4.x applications.

LDTP is/was used by the following companies/organizations:

 GNOME
 Mozilla
 Openoffice.org
 KDE
 Novell/SuSE
 Palm Source
 VMware

LDTP can be used to remotely test applications.

The LDTP is released under the LGPL.

History

LDTP version 0.1.0 was released in January 2005 and then showcased and discussed at GUADEC 2005. It was then used at the Google Summer of Code in 2006 for Tinderbox integration, Evolution automation, and LDTP regression suite under GNOME organization. Then again in 2007, it was used by the Mozilla Foundation for Firefox automation and Tinderbox integration.

Example

This is an example of how LDTP would test writing in gedit:

#!/usr/bin/env python3

# The standard import stuff.
from ldtp import *
from ooldtp import context as locate
from time import sleep

# Here we open the app.
launchapp("gedit")

# Now we find it and make sure it is open.
gedit_win = locate("*gedit")
gedit_win.waittillguiexist()

# Now we type into gedit.
text_field = gedit_win.getchild("txt1")
text_field.enterstring("G'Day mate!")

# Save a picture to prove we did it.
imagecapture("*gedit", "/tmp/foo.png")

# Quit gedit.
quit = gedit_win.getchild("mnuQuit")
quit.selectmenuitem()

# Close without saving.
dont_save = locate("Question")
dont_save.waittillguiexist()

button = dont_save.getchild("btnClosewithoutSaving")
button.click()

# Wait until gedit is gone.
gedit_win.waittillguinotexist()

Diagram of how LDTP works

See also 

 List of Linux GUI testing tools
 Desktop Linux

References

External links
 
 Mago Ubuntu wrapper using LDTP

Freedesktop.org
Free software programmed in Python